St. Albert Trail is a major arterial road connecting the cities of Edmonton and St. Albert, Alberta. It is part of a  continuous roadway that runs through Sherwood Park, Edmonton, and St. Albert that includes Wye Road, Sherwood Park Freeway, Whyte Avenue, portions of University Avenue and Saskatchewan Drive, and Groat Road.

The route begins as Groat Road, and becomes St. Albert Trail at 118 Avenue (at a traffic circle with traffic lights). At the interchange with Yellowhead Trail, the road becomes part of Alberta Highway 2.  After only a few blocks (137 Avenue) the road now becomes Mark Messier Trail, as it moves away from central Edmonton. At the Edmonton – St. Albert boundary the road was known as St. Albert Road until early 2009 when St. Albert City Council approved a name change from St. Albert Road to St. Albert Trail. St. Albert Trail keeps this designation throughout that city, before exiting the city boundaries to the north where it becomes a divided highway as far north as Morinville. North of the St. Albert boundary the road has no other name than Highway 2.

Two smaller segments of St. Albert Trail also exists as local roads, separated from the artery when Edmonton expanded its grid system of streets, and cut it off. They are a southbound only at 111 Avenue & 127 Street, and a two way from 112 Avenue to 117 Avenue.

Neighbourhoods
List of neighbourhoods St. Albert Trail runs through, in order from south to north. Coincidentally it starts in Inglewood, Edmonton, and runs through Inglewood, St. Albert.

Edmonton
Inglewood
Sherbrooke
Dovercourt
Rampart

St. Albert
Akinsdale
Sturgeon Heights
Downtown
Mission
Inglewood
Deer Ridge
Erin Ridge
Lacombe Park

Major intersections
This is a list of major intersections, starting at the south end of St. Albert Trail.

See also 

 Transportation in Edmonton

References

Roads in Edmonton
Roads in St. Albert, Alberta